Qarah Khan (also Romanized as Qarah Khān and Ghareh Khan) is a village in Farsesh Rural District, in the Central District of Aligudarz County, Lorestan Province, Iran. At the 2006 census, its population was 111, in 20 families.

References 

Towns and villages in Aligudarz County